Ibero Americana Radio Chile is the main Chilean radio conglomerate belonging to PRISA Radio, a subsidiary of the Spanish group PRISA.

Location 
The offices and studios of all IARC radios (except ADN) are located at Eliodoro Yanez 1783, Providencia, Santiago. The ADN studies, are next to its corporate building, in Eliodoro Yáñez 1804.

Stations

Modulated frequency 
 ADN Radio
 Concierto
 Corazón
 FM Dos
 Futuro
 Imagina
 Los 40
 Pudahuel
 Radio Activa
 Rock & Pop

Internet 
 Radio Uno

Missing stations 
 Bésame Radio.
 FM Hit.
 W Radio.

Current frequencies

Northern zone 
Arica y Parinacota Region
Arica
 88.1 MHz Concierto
 89.7 MHz Radio Activa
 91.5 MHz Pudahuel
 95.3 MHz ADN Radio Chile
 97.7 MHz Radio Imagina
 98.5 MHz Los 40
 99.5 MHz Futuro
 100.7 MHz FM Dos
 105.3 MHz Corazón FM

Tarapacá Region
Iquique
 89.7 MHz Los 40
 90.7 MHz Radio Activa
 93.9 MHz Rock & Pop
 94.7 MHz Corazón FM
 96.3 MHz Concierto
 101.3 MHz FM Dos
 103.1 MHz ADN Radio Chile
 103.7 MHz Pudahuel
 105.3 MHz Radio Imagina
 105.7 MHz Futuro

Antofagasta Region
Calama
 91.1 MHz ADN Radio Chile
 95.3 MHz Pudahuel 
 98.5 MHz Radio Activa
 103.5 MHz Corazón FM
 104.7 MHz FM Dos
Antofagasta
 88.9 MHz ADN Radio Chile
 90.7 MHz Concierto
 91.5 MHz Corazón FM
 94.5 MHz Futuro
 95.9 MHz Pudahuel
 98.5 MHz FM Dos
 100.5 MHz Radio Activa
 105.1 MHz Los 40

Atacama Region
Copiapó
 89.3 MHz Pudahuel
 92.1 MHz Radio Activa
 94.7 MHz Corazón FM
 97.7 MHz Los 40
 98.9 MHz Radio Imagina
 101.7 MHz ADN Radio Chile
 102.5 MHz Concierto
 104.9 MHz Futuro
 105.7 MHz FM Dos

Coquimbo Region
La Serena/Coquimbo
 89.5 MHz ADN Radio Chile
 90.1 MHz Concierto
 91.7 MHz Corazón FM
 92.3 MHz Futuro
 96.3 MHz Rock & Pop
 99.9 MHz Pudahuel
 100.9 MHz Radio Activa
 105.3 MHz FM Dos
 105.7 MHz Los 40
 106.3 MHz Radio Imagina
Ovalle
 90.1 MHz Radio Activa
 92.7 MHz Pudahuel
 98.1 MHz ADN Radio Chile
 104.3 MHz FM Dos
 105.1 MHz Corazón FM
 Tongoy
 98.9 MHz ADN Radio Chile

Central zone 
Valparaíso Region
 90.3 MHz Radio Imagina
 91.7 MHz Los 40 
 93.1 MHz Concierto
 94.1 MHz ADN Radio Chile
 100.5 MHz Corazón FM
 104.5 MHz FM Dos
 105.7 MHz Pudahuel
San Felipe/Los Andes
 89.3 MHz FM Dos
 90.1 MHz Pudahuel
 96.9 MHz ADN Radio Chile
San Antonio
 88.7 MHz Radio Activa
 91.5 MHz ADN Radio Chile
 94.3 MHz Corazón FM
 94.7 MHz Pudahuel 
 100.9 MHz FM Dos
Rapa Nui
 88.3 MHz ADN Radio Chile
 104.3 MHz Los 40

Santiago Metropolitan Region
 88.1 MHz Imagina
 88.5 MHz Concierto
 88.9 MHz Futuro
 90.5 MHz Pudahuel
 91.7 MHz ADN Radio Chile
 92.5 MHz Radio Activa
 94.1 MHz Rock & Pop
 98.5 MHz FM Dos 
 101.3 MHz Corazón
 101.7 MHz Los 40

O'Higgins Region
Rancagua
 91.7 MHz Pudahuel
 100.7 MHz Los 40
 101.1 MHz FM Dos
 103.7 MHz ADN Radio Chile
 104.3 MHz Corazón

Maule Region
Curicó
 97.7 MHz ADN Radio Chile
Talca
 90.3 MHz Pudahuel
 91.7 MHz Radio Activa
 93.5 MHz ADN Radio Chile
 98.1 MHz FM Dos
 98.9 MHz Radio Imagina
 100.1 MHz Rock & Pop
 104.5 MHz Corazón FM
Constitución 
 90.1 MHz ADN Radio Chile
Linares
 88.9 MHz Pudahuel
 91.3 MHz ADN Radio Chile
 93.1 MHz Corazón FM
Parral
 89.3 MHz ADN Radio Chile
Cauquenes
 95.1 MHz Los 40
 98.3 MHz ADN Radio Chile

Ñuble Region
Chillán
 96.3 MHz FM Dos
 101.3 MHz ADN Radio Chile
 103.9 MHz Pudahuel

Biobío Region
Gran Concepción
 92.5 MHz Los 40 
 93.1 MHz Rock & Pop
 96.1 MHz Corazón FM
 99.9 MHz Pudahuel
 101.1 MHz FM Dos
 104.1 MHz ADN Radio Chile
 106.5 MHz Radio Futuro
Los Ángeles
 90.3 MHz Pudahuel
 103.1 MHz Corazón FM
 104.9 MHz ADN Radio Chile

Southern zone 
Araucania Region 
Temuco
 90.3 MHz Pudahuel
 92.1 MHz ADN Radio Chile
 92.9 MHz Los 40
 93.5 MHz Rock & Pop
 95.5 MHz Radio Activa
 99.5 MHz FM Dos
 104.7 MHz Futuro
 105.7 MHz Corazón FM
Villarrica/Pucón
 89.1 MHz Los 40
 89.7 MHz Pudahuel 
 97.1 MHz ADN Radio Chile
 98.1 MHz Radio Concierto
 102.3 MHz ADN Radio Chile
 106.5 MHz FM Dos

Los Rios Region
Valdivia
 92.5 MHz Pudahuel
 97.3 MHz Corazón FM
 99.3 MHz Los 40
 100.5 MHz FM Dos
 102.3 MHz Radio Concierto
 104.1 MHz ADN Radio Chile
Futrono
 89.3 MHz ADN Radio Chile

Los Lagos Region
Osorno
 89.7 MHz Corazón FM
 91.9 MHz Pudahuel
 92.3 MHz ADN Radio Chile
 97.1 MHz FM Dos
Puerto Varas.
 88.5 MHz ADN Radio Chile
Puerto Montt
 88.1 MHz ADN Radio Chile
 89.9 MHz Radio Corazón
 95.5 MHz Pudahuel 
 100.3 MHz Radio Activa
 102.5 MHz Los 40
 104.5 MHz FM Dos
 105.9 MHz Futuro
Ancud/Castro
 93.7 MHz Pudahuel 
 104.3 MHz ADN Radio Chile (Castro)
 106.5 MHz ADN Radio Chile (Ancud)

Aysén Region
Coyhaique
 89.5 MHz Corazón FM
 92.9 MHz Radio Activa
 94.5 MHz FM Dos
 101.5 MHz Radio Imagina
 105.1 MHz ADN Radio Chile
 106.5 MHz Pudahuel

Magallanes and Chilean Antarctica Region
Punta Arenas
 89.7 MHz Futuro
 91.5 MHz Corazón FM
 92.1 MHz FM Dos
 92.7 MHz Radio Concierto
 93.5 MHz ADN Radio Chile
 94.7 MHz Los 40
 98.3 MHz Pudahuel 
 105.7 MHz Radio Activa

Notes 
 At the beginning of 2002, Radio Corazón leaves 94.5 MHz in Antofagasta, being replaced by Radio Futuro.
 On April 1, 2007, Radio Imagina leaves 100.5 MHz in Viña del Mar and Valparaiso and 91.5 MHz in Antofagasta, being replaced in both cases by Radio Corazón. On that same date Radio Concierto leaves 96.1 MHz in Concepción and Talcahuano, being replaced by the same Radio Corazón.
 In 2008, Rock & Pop leaves 89.1 in Villarrica, being replaced by Los 40.
 In May 2008, Rock & Pop leaves 105.5 in Algarrobo, and Radio Pudahuel leaves 94.3 MHz in Vallenar, being replaced in both cases by ADN Radio Chile, in that same one Date Radio Pudahuel leaves 92.9 MHz in Constitución, being replaced by Radio Imagina, which emigrated from the 90.1 MHz (current ADN Radio Chile).
 In May 2008, Radio Corazón moves from 91.5 MHz to 88.7 MHz in the city of Chillán, a frequency previously occupied by ADN Radio Chile.
 In May 2008, FM Dos leaves 92.7 MHz in Los Ángeles.
 In May 2008, Radio Corazón left 96.9 MHz in Puerto Montt and 106.7 in Ancud, being replaced by Positiva FM and ADN Radio Chile, respectively.
 In June 2008, Radio Concierto leaves 92.3 MHz in Panguipulli, being replaced by ADN Radio Chile.
 On March 13, 2009, Radio Concierto leaves 98.9 in Tongoy, 101.5 in Lago Rapel, 89.3 in Futrono and 103.1 in Puerto Varas, being replaced by ADN Radio Chile.
 At the beginning of 2011, Radio Imagina leaves 105.1 MHz for the second time in Antofagasta, being replaced by its sister Los 40. This because the previous frequency (97.1 MHz) was leased and is currently used by Digital FM, has no relation with IARC.
 On August 5, 2013, Rock & Pop leaves 97.7 in Punta Arenas, being replaced by My Radio.
 On March 17, 2014, ADN Radio Chile changed frequency in Puerto Varas from 103.1 to 88.5 MHz, leaving in 103.1 to Radio Imagina.
 In 2014, by community radio law, in order to order commercial radios and low reception, several radios of the consortium had to be relocated on the dial:
 In Arica, Radio Corazón moves from the 107.5 MHz to 105.3 MHz.
 In Iquique, Radio Futuro moves from the 107.3 MHz to 105.7 MHz.
 In Calama, ADN Radio Chile moves from the 107.1 MHz to 91.1 MHz.
 In La Serena y Coquimbo, FM Dos moves from the 107.9 MHz to 105.3 MHz.
 In Valparaíso, Los 40 moves from the 107.1 MHz to 91.7 MHz. The same happens with Radio Pudahuel, moving from the 107.7 MHz to 105.7 MHz.
 In Los Ángeles, Radio Imagina changed the 106.7 to 104.1 MHz. 
 In Pucón, ADN Radio Chile moves from the 107.1 MHz to 102.3 MHz.
 In Valdivia, Radio Imagina moves from the 107.5 to 106.1 MHz.
 In Puerto Montt, Radio Pudahuel changed the 106.9 to 95.5 MHz.
 In Coyhaique, FM Dos moves from the 106.9 MHz to 94.5 MHz.
 During the last time also several frequencies of the conglomerate stopped to emit because in these frequencies began to issue the transmitter evangelical Radio Armonía:
 On July 31, 2014, Rock & Pop leaves 104.9 MHz in Copiapó and Tierra Amarilla being replaced by Radio Futuro.
 On August 19, 2014, Radio Concierto leaves 93.9 MHz in San Antonio and Litoral Central.
 On September 23, 2014, Los 40 leaves 99.1 MHz in San Felipe and Los Andes.
 On September 15, 2014, Radio Activa leaves 96.7 MHz in Valdivia.
 As of January 2, 2015, Los 40 leaves 102.9 MHz in Talca.
 On January 2, 2015, Radio Imagina leaves 103.1 MHz in Puerto Montt.
 On January 1, 2015, ADN Radio Chile leaves 103.5 MHz in Melipilla.
 On March 23, 2016, Rock & Pop leaves 93.1 in Valparaiso, being replaced by Radio Concierto.
 On February 25, 2016, Radio Uno stopped broadcasting on Santiago's 97.1 MHz, because the proposal was no longer new. The signal was leased and is currently used by Radio Corporación, a Christian court (it has no relation with IARC) and Radio Uno will continue as an online signal for everything Chile and the world.
 In September 2016, ADN Radio Chile leaves the 102.7 MHz of Rengo and Radio Uno leaves 91.1 MHz of La Serena and Coquimbo, both were sold and replaced by Radio Corporación.
 On December 23, 2016, ADN Radio Chile leaves 91.5 MHz of Pinto, being replaced by Radio Imagina.
 On January 1, 2017, Rock & Pop leaves 89.9 of Puerto Montt, being replaced by Radio Corazón returning to the city after almost 9 years of absence.
 On May 9, 2017, Radio Activa leaves 88.5 of Osorno, being replaced and sold by Radio Corporación.
 On May 10, 2017, Rock & Pop leaves 102.5 of Arica, being replaced and sold by Radio Corporación.
 On May 16, 2017, Rock & Pop leaves 93.5 of Osorno, being replaced Radioactiva returning to the city after almost 6 days of absence, whose frequency (88.5) in the city had been sold to Radio Corporación.
 On March 8, 2019, Radio Imagina leaves 106.5 MHz of Calama, being sold and replaced by Radio Desierto, has no relation with IARC.
 On December 15, 2019, Radio Imagina leaves 91.5 MHz of Pinto.
 On November 4, 2021, Radio Imagina leaves 106.1 MHz of Valdivia, being sold and replaced by Radio Beethoven, has no relation with IARC.
 On November 4, 2021, Rock & Pop leaves 102.3 MHz of Valdivia, being replaced by Radio Concierto returning to the city after 1 year of absence.

Premios MUSA 
On 4 December, 2020, the broadcaster confirmed the first edition of the MUSA Award. The award ceremony aims to reward the most successful Chilean and international artists in the different radio stations.

Notes and references

Notes

References

External links 
 Ibero Americana Radio Chile
 Prisa Radio
 PRISA
 Imagina
 Concierto
 Futuro
 Pudahuel
 ADN
 Activa
 Rock & Pop
 Radio UNO 
 FM Dos
 Corazón
 Los 40

Radio in Chile
Broadcasting in Chile
Entertainment in Chile